The 2010 Manx Grand Prix races were held between Saturday 21 August and Friday 3 September 2010 on the 37.733-mile Mountain Course.

The Blue Riband event of Manx Grand Prix Race week was won by Simon Fulton claiming victory in the Senior Manx Grand Prix including a lap at an average speed of 120.119 mph.  A double was completed by Roy Richardson winning the Senior Classic and Junior Classic races with Peter Wakefield winning the Classic Lightweight class and Chris McGahan the winner of the inaugural Formula Classic Race.  The Newcomers Race provided a double win for local Isle of Man competitors with Tim Venables the overall winner and Jonny Heginbotham winning the Class B event.  The Post Classic Race was dominated by Michael Dunlop, the overall winner with Chris Palmer first in the Class (ii) Post Classic Junior race.  The combined Lightweight Manx Grand Prix produced two new winners for perennial Manx Grand Prix competitors Neil Kent and also Philip McGurk in the Ultra-Lightweight class. During the Junior Manx Grand Prix, two competitors crashed fatally at Alpine Cottage on lap 2.  The Junior Manx Grand Prix was declared a result after 1 lap and Michael Sweeney the winner after Simon Fulton received a 10-second race penalty and demoted to third place.

Practice

The first practice session for the 2010 Manx Grand Prix including the Newcomers Speed Control Lap was scheduled for 17:20 pm on Saturday 21 August 2010. The public roads that form the Snaefell Mountain Course closing 1 hour earlier at 17:00 pm for the first time at a Manx Grand Prix meeting.  The start of the Newcomers Speed Control Lap was delayed over 1 hour due to clearing showers and low mist on the Mountain Section of the course.  The familiarisation lap started at 18:28 pm with 41 new competitors escorted in small groups by three TT Travelling Marshals accompanied with experienced former Manx Grand Prix competitors including Nigel Beattie, Mark Parrett, Carolynn Sells, Isle of Man TT Liaison Officer John Barton and Isle of Man TT winner Chris Palmer.  The untimed practice session for the Junior and Senior classes started at 18:50 pm followed by the Lightweight and Classic machines at 19:20 pm with practice ending at 20:05 pm.  The Newcomer Osmo Partti from Finland crashed at Sulby Bridge and was uninjured during the first practice session and Colin Martin was evacuated by the Airmed Helicopter to Nobles Hospital after an accident at Cruickshanks Corner in Ramsey.

The second practice session on Monday 23 August 2010 was held in bluster conditions and early evening rain showers that left wet roads all round the Mountain Course. Despite the conditions, the fastest lap of the session was set by local Isle of Man competitor John Smyth in 21 minutes and 45.78 seconds at an average speed of 104.021 mph.  The Senior Classic class was led by Olie Linsdell riding a 500c Paton recording a time at an average speed of 100.327 mph and Michael Dunlop set the fastest time in the Post Classic with a time of 24 minutes and 28.12 seconds an average speed of 92.518 mph riding a 997 cc Suzuki XR69 motorcycle.  The fastest time in the Newcomers class 'A' was set by Andy Fenton riding a 600 cc Yamaha in 21 minutes and 58.61 seconds an average speed of 103.009 mph and Dan Sayle led the Lightweight class with an average speed of 96.022 mph.  Minor incidents reported during the Monday evening practice session included Steve Hodgson and Tim Venables at the Gooseneck and Adam Easton at Bedstead Corner.

The Tuesday evening practice session on 24 August 2010 is held in better weather conditions with dry roads on the course with strong cross-winds on the Mountain Section.  The session was delayed until 18:35 pm to allow an ambulance to attend to a domestic emergency, crossing the course at Parliament Square, Ramsey.  The better conditions produced fastest times with Simon Fulton leading the Senior and Junior Manx Grand Prix classes with a time of 19 minutes and 19.83 seconds an average speed of 104.021 mph.  The Senior Classic is further dominated by Olie Linsdell riding a 500 cc Paton motorcycle with a time  of 20 minutes and 47.34 seconds increasing his average speed to 108.894 mph and Dan Sayle sets an average speed of 112.409 mph to lead the Lightweight class.  The Newcomer's 'A' class leaderboard is led by Andy Fenton with a time of 19 minutes and 57.44 seconds an average speed of 113.432 mph and Jonny Heginbotham records an average speed of 105.037 riding a 650 cc Kawasaki ER6 to lead the Newcomer's 'B' class.  The Post Senior Classic it is Olie Lindsdell riding a 746 cc Yamaha FZ motorcycle that sets the fastest with a time of 20 minutes and 34.41 seconds and an average speed of 110.035 mph and Mark Buckley setting the second fastest time with an average speed of 109.680 riding a 997 cc Suzuki XR69 motorcycle. A similar livered Suzuki XR69 ridden by Michael Dunlop records an average speed of 106.725 mph and suffers mechanical failure on the second lap of practice and stops at Parliament Square, Ramsey. The Finnish newcomer Osmo Partti, has a second minor incident at Sarah's Cottage and Wayne Martin has accident at Whitegates as is evacuated to Nobles Hospital by Airmed Helicopter.  Further minor incidents during Tuesday evening practice session include Gary Fowler at the Water Works Corner and Darryl McGeown at Governor's Bridge.

Results

Practice Times

2010 Senior Manx Grand Prix Practice Times & Leaderboard
  Plates; Black on Yellow.

2010 Junior Manx Grand Prix Practice Times & Leaderboard
 Plates; White on Blue.

2010 Senior Classic Practice Times and Leaderboard
 Plates; White digits on Black race plates.
 Classic Machines 351 cc-500 cc

2010 Junior Classic Practice Times and Leaderboard
 Plates; Black digits on White race plates.
 Class A Classic Machines 300 cc-350 cc

2010 Lightweight Manx Grand Prix Practice Times & Leaderboard
 Class A Machines 201 cc-250 cc

2010 Post Classic Senior Class Practice Times and Leaderboard
 Plates; White digits on Red race plates.
 Class (i)
 Classic Machines 601 cc-1050 cc Four-stroke motorcycles.
 351 cc-750 cc Two-stroke motorcycles.

2010 Newcomers Race 'A' Practice Times and Leaderboard
 Plates; White digits on Red race plates
 Class A
 550 cc-750 cc Four-stroke Four-cylinder motorcycles.
 651 cc-1000 cc Four-stroke Twin-cylinder motorcycles.
 601 cc-675 cc Four-stroke Three-cylinder motorcycles.
 601 cc-1000 cc Rotary motorcycles.

2010 Newcomers Race 'B' Practice Times and Leaderboard
 Plates; White digits on Red race plates
 Class B
 251 cc-400 cc Four-stroke Four-cylinder motorcycles.
 Up to 650 cc Four-stroke Twin-cylinder motorcycles.

Race Results

Race 1a; Newcomers Race 'A'
Monday 30 August 2010  Mountain Course 4 laps – 150.92 miles (242.80 km)
 Class A
 550 cc-750 cc Four-stroke Four-cylinder motorcycles.
 651 cc-1000 cc Four-stroke Twin-cylinder motorcycles.
 601 cc-675 cc Four-stroke Three-cylinder motorcycles.
 601 cc-1000 cc Rotary motorcycles.

Race 1a; Newcomers Race 'B'
Monday 30 August 2010  Mountain Course 4 laps – 150.92 miles (242.80 km)
 Class B
 251 cc-400 cc Four-stroke Four-cylinder motorcycles.
 Up to 650 cc Four-stroke Twin-cylinder motorcycles.

Race 1b; Race Post Classic Senior Race
Monday 30 August 2010  Mountain Course 4 laps – 150.92 miles (242.80 km)
 Class (i)
 Classic Machines 601 cc-1050 cc Four-stroke motorcycles.
 351 cc-750 cc Two-stroke motorcycles.

Fastest Lap; Michael Dunlop  118.186 mph (19 minutes 09.27 secs) on lap 2

Race 1b; Post Classic Junior Race
 Class (ii)
 126 cc-250 cc Two-stroke Cylinder Grand Prix/Standard motorcycles.
 251 cc-350 cc Two-stroke Cylinder standard motorcycles.
 Up to 600cccc Four-stroke Cylinder motorcycles.
Monday 30 August 2010 – Mountain Course 4 laps – 150.92 miles (242.80 km)
 For motorcycles exceeding 175 cc and not exceeding 250 cc

Fastest Lap; Chris Palmer  111.729 mph (20 minutes 15.69 secs) on lap 1

Race 2a; Junior Classic Race

Monday 30 August 2010  Mountain Course 4 laps – 150.92 miles (242.80 km)
 For motorcycles exceeding 300 cc and not exceeding 351 cc

Fastest Lap; Roy Richardson 102.948 mph (21 minutes 59.38 secs)

Race 2b; Lightweight Classic Race

Monday 30 August 2010 – Mountain Course 4 laps – 150.92 miles (242.80 km)
 For motorcycles exceeding 175 cc and not exceeding 250 cc

Fastest Lap; Ewan Hamilton  94.273 mph (24 minutes 00.80 secs)

Race 3; Junior Manx Grand Prix
Wednesday 1 September 2010  Mountain Course 1 lap – 37.733 miles (60.73 km) Reduced Race Distance (Revised Result).
 201 cc-250 cc Two-stroke Two-cylinder motorcycles
 550 cc-600 cc Four-stroke Four-cylinder motorcycles.
 601 cc-675 cc Four-stroke Three-cylinder motorcycles.
 651 cc-750 cc Four-stroke Two-cylinder motorcycles.

Fastest Lap; Simon Fulton  119.516 mph (18 minutes 56.48 secs) on lap 1 (10 second penalty added to race time)

Race 4; Senior Classic Race
Thursday 2 September 2010  Mountain Course 4 laps – 150.92 miles (242.80 km)
 For motorcycles exceeding 351 cc and not exceeding 500 cc

Fastest Lap: Alan Oversby – 109.089 mph (20 minutes 45.11 secs)

Race 4b; Formula Classic Race
Thursday 2 September 2010  Mountain Course 4 laps – 150.92 miles (242.80 km)
 For motorcycles exceeding 501 cc and not exceeding 750 cc

Fastest Lap; Chris McGahan  104.863 mph (21 minutes 35.29 secs)

Race 5a; Lightweight Manx Grand Prix
Friday 3 September 2010  Mountain Course 4 laps – 150.92 miles (242.80 km)
 Two-stroke motorcycles 201 cc – 350 cc

Fastest Lap; Neil Kent  112.078 mph (20 minutes 11.91 seconds) on lap 2

Race 5b; Ultra-Lightweight Manx Grand Prix
Friday 3 September 2010  Mountain Course 4 laps – 150.92 miles (242.80 km)
 Two-stroke motorcycles up to 125 cc, 6 gears maximum.
 Four-stroke motorcycles 251 cc – 401 cc
 Up to 650 cc Four-stroke twin-cylinder.

Fastest Lap; Phillip McGurk  112.572 mph (20 minutes 06.58 seconds) on lap 4

Race 6; Senior Manx Grand Prix
Friday 3 September 2010  Mountain Course 4 laps – 150.92 miles (242.80 km)
 Four-stroke Four-cylinder motorcycles exceeding 550 cc and not exceeding 750 cc.
 Four-stroke Twin-cylinder motorcycles exceeding 651 cc and not exceeding 1000 cc.
 Four-stroke Three-cylinder motorcycles exceeding 601 cc and not exceeding 675 cc.

Fastest Lap; Simon Fulton  120.119 mph (18 minutes 50.78 secs) on lap 1.

Gallery

References

External links

2010
Manx
Manx
Manx